William Berg may refer to:

William Berg (classicist)
William Berg (footballer), played for Royn Hvalba
William H. Berg House

See also
Bill Berg (disambiguation)
William of Berg (disambiguation)
William Burgh (disambiguation)